Episternal ossicles (or suprasternal ossicles) are small bones that are sometimes present at the upper end of the chest bone. The prevalence of these ossicles is around 1.5%.

Structure 
The episternal ossicles are oval-shaped bones that are occasionally found at the superior and posterior border of the manubrium. The episternal ossicles were first described by Cobb in 1937. They may be present unilaterally or bilaterally. Its size ranges from 2-15 mm depending on individuals. These ossicles are asymptomatic and does not cause any harm, although it may be diagnosed as fracture, vascular ossification or calcified lymph nodes.

See also 
 Sternum
 List of anatomical variation

References 

Anatomical variations
Human anatomy
Congenital disorders of musculoskeletal system
Bones of the thorax